Sanchit Mohan Sharma (born 22 July 2001) is an Indian-born cricketer who plays for the United Arab Emirates national cricket team. In October 2021, he was named in the UAE's Twenty20 International (T20I) squad for the 2021 Summer T20 Bash tournament. He made his T20I debut on 7 October 2021, for the UAE against Ireland. Before his T20I debut, he was named in the UAE's squad for the 2020 Under-19 Cricket World Cup.

Personal life
Sharma grew up in Ajman along with his sister Khushi Sharma, who made her debut for the UAE women's team in 2021. Their Indian father Brij Mohan Sharma moved to the UAE in 1990 to work as a mechanical engineer, later establishing a metal trading firm. He played cricket at high levels in his home state of Haryana.

References

External links
 

2001 births
Living people
Emirati cricketers
United Arab Emirates Twenty20 International cricketers
People from the Emirate of Ajman
Indian expatriate sportspeople in the United Arab Emirates